Laayoune TV is a Moroccan public television channel in the area of Western Sahara. It is a part of the state-owned SNRT Group along with Al Aoula, Arryadia, Athaqafia, Al Maghribia, Assadissa, Aflam TV and Tamazight TV. The channel was established in November 2004, available on all digital platforms (satellite, DTT and cable), the channel is based in Laâyoune (El Aaiún). The channel offers a variety of programs in Moroccan Arabic and Hassaniya Arabic.

References

External links

Official website
Laayoune TV at LyngSat Address

2004 establishments in Western Sahara
Television stations in Western Sahara
Television channels and stations established in 2004
Société Nationale de Radiodiffusion et de Télévision